2-Aminothiazoline-4-carboxylic acid (ACTA) is the organosulfur compound and a heterocycle with the formula HO2CCHCH2SCNH2N.  This derivative of thiazoline is an intermediate in the industrial synthesis of L-cysteine, an amino acid.  ACTA exists in equilibrium with its tautomer 2-iminothiazolidine-4-carboxylic acid.

It is produced by the reaction of methyl chloroacrylate with thiourea.  It is also a biomarker for cyanide poisoning, as it results from the condensation of cysteine and cyanide.

References

Thiazolines
Carboxylic acids